Neopets is a virtual pet website. Users can own virtual pets ("Neopets") and buy virtual items for them using one of two virtual currencies. One currency, called Neopoints, can be earned within the site, and the other, Neocash, can either be purchased with real-world money, or won by chance in-game.

The website was launched by Adam Powell and Donna Williams in late 1999. Two years later, a consortium of investors led by Doug Dohring bought a controlling interest in the company and in June 2005, Viacom (the company that owns Nickelodeon) bought Neopets Inc. for US$160 million. On 17 March 2014, Viacom and Nickelodeon sold Neopets to JumpStart Games for an undisclosed amount. On 3 July 2017, Chinese company NetDragon acquired JumpStart.

Gameplay

Neopets allows users to create and care for digital pets called "Neopets" and explore the virtual world of Neopia. There is no set objective for the users, but they are expected to feed and care for their Neopets when they grow hungry or ill. Neopets will not die if neglected, but their health can limit their gameplay. Neopets come in a variety of species and colors and users can create or adopt their own. Users can obtain items to interact with their Neopet, such as books to read and toys to play with them. Neopets can be customised with certain clothing items, paintbrushes, morphing potions, and accessories. Neopets themselves can have pets of their own called Petpets. Users can build a customisable Neohome for their Neopets and furnish it with furniture, wallpaper, and flooring. Neopets can battle against other Neopets or non-player characters in the Battledome but they cannot die there.

Neopia is a virtual planet with fantasy lands inhabited by Neopets and other virtual creatures. Each land has a different theme, such as pirates or prehistory, and their own shops, games, and attractions. Neopia follows its own calendar and time zone, which runs concurrent with real-world Pacific Time, and has tie-ins with certain real-world holidays such as Halloween and Christmas. It has its own economy and stock market based on Neopoints. Users can earn Neopoints through various means including playing games and selling items, which can be invested or used to buy various virtual goods and services.

The site is regularly updated with features like new games, items, and content. Occasionally, the Neopets team release interactive storylines to expand the in-universe lore. In addition to the site content updated by the Neopets team, users also contribute content to the site. User contributions come in the form of prescreened submissions and readily editable content that is automatically filtered, such as the site's weekly electronic newspaper The Neopian Times. There are different types of submissions that will be accepted.

Games
Users can earn Neopoints from playing games. Games come in many different genres, which include action, puzzles, and luck & chance. Most games have set maximum earnings or playtime. Players may also earn trophies and other awards from games if they score high enough or perform better than other users. Many single-player and multiplayer browser games are available. Users can also participate in contests and spotlights judged by staff to showcase the users' talents. Quests to retrieve items may also be performed for specific NPCs. Challenges may be made against other players or random players in a "World Challenge" for a prize piece and Neopoints from the jackpot for certain web games. Monthly competitions also exist for multiplayer games with four week-long elimination rounds.

Economy
The economy is based on Neopoints. Users can also exchange real money for Neocash, used exclusively for the NC Mall. Users can earn Neopoints through playing games, selling items, and other transactions. Once earned, they can be saved in the bank, used to buy items from other users or non-player character (NPC) shops, used to buy and sell stocks in the Neopian stock market called the NEODAQ (a parody of the NASDAQ), or used to buy various other things. Items can be bought from shops found throughout the world of Neopia that are run by NPCs who may allow bargaining. Users can open their own shops to sell items, sometimes after obtaining those items at a lower price from sources such as other shops or charities. Items may also be exchanged through trading or auctions.

Community
Neopets has a community for users to chat with and contact other users. Each user has their own profile they can edit with HTML and CSS and are represented by avatars provided by the website, as users cannot upload their own. Most avatars must be "unlocked" by completing certain in-game tasks, such as winning a contest or getting a high score on a game.

Users may request other users to be "Neofriends" or block other users from contacting them. To comply with COPPA, users under 13 years of age cannot access any of the site's communication features without sending in parental consent via fax. The main features include:

 NeoMail, a personal in-game communication system like regular email. Users can write messages to other users and restrict who can contact them through NeoMail.
 Neoboards, public discussion boards for on-topic discussions. Users can enter their own "neoHTML", a restricted form of BBCode, to customise their posts and signatures.
 Guilds, groups of users with similar interests and their own message board.

Discussions through these features are restricted and may not involve topics such as dating and romance or controversial topics like politics and religion. Continuous moderation is performed by paid Neopets staff members, and users can help moderate the site by reporting messages they believe are inappropriate or offensive. Messages are also automatically filtered to prevent users from posting messages with profanity or lewd content.

History and development

Creation and growth
Neopets was conceived in 1997 by Adam Powell, a British student at the University of Nottingham at the time. He shared this idea with Donna Williams and the two started work on the site in September 1999, with Powell responsible for the programming and the database and Williams the web design and art. Their original office was located in Guildford. With the help of two friends, the site launched on 15 November 1999. Powell stated that the original goal was to "keep university students entertained, and possibly make some cash from banner advertising". The site contained popular culture references, such as a Neopet that was simply a picture of Bruce Forsyth.

The user base grew by word of mouth and by Christmas 1999, Neopets was logging 600,000 page views daily and sought investors to cover the high cost of running the site. Later in the month, American businessman Doug Dohring was introduced to the creators of the site and, along with other investors, bought a majority share in January of the following year. Dohring founded Neopets, Inc. in February 2000 and began business on 28 April. Dohring used Scientology's Org Board to manage the company. Adam and Donna were unaware of the Scientology connections until searching the employees at the newly formed company six months later but did not address this until the company hired a woman to introduce Scientology to Neopets. Adam and Donna stopped the addition of any Scientology education to Neopets and ensured such content never made it into anything site-related.

With the new company, intellectual property that did not belong to Neopets was removed but the site kept the British spellings. The website made money from the first paying customers using an advertising method trademarked as "immersive advertising" and touted as "an evolutionary step forward in the traditional marketing practice of product placement" in television and film. In 2004, Neopets released a premium version and started showing advertisements on the basic site that were not shown to premium members.

Viacom era
Viacom, the American conglomerate that owns Nickelodeon, purchased Neopets, Inc. on 20 June 2005 for $160 million and announced plans to focus more on the use of banner ads over the site's existing immersive advertising. Adam Powell and Donna Williams left Neopets, Inc. shortly after the purchase due to creative differences. The website was redesigned on 27 April 2007 and included changes to the user interface and the ability to customise Neopets. In June, Viacom promoted Neopets through minishows on its Nickelodeon channel. Promotions included the second Altador Cup and led to an increase in traffic through the site. The first Altador Cup was released as an international online gaming event to coincide with the 2006 FIFA World Cup to improve interactivity between users and had 10.4 million participants the first year. On 17 July, the NC Mall was launched in a partnership with Korean gaming company Nexon Corporation. It allowed users to use real money to purchase Neocash to buy exclusive virtual items. On 17 June 2008, Viacom formed the Nickelodeon Kids & Family Virtual Worlds Group to "encompass all paid and subscription gaming initiatives across all relevant platforms", including Neopets. By June 2011, Neopets announced that the website had logged 1 trillion page views since its creation.

In July 2009, the Neopets site was the target of an identity theft hacking scheme that attempted to trick users into clicking a link that would allow them to gain items or Neopoints. Upon doing so, malware was installed onto the user's computer. According to reports, the hack was aimed not at child players' Neopets accounts, but at using the malware to steal the financial data and identities of their parents. Viacom stated that it was investigating the issue, and that the hack was a version of social engineering rather than an "indictment of Neopets security practices". In an on-site newsletter for players, Neopets denied the report and claimed that the site's security measures prevented the posting of such links.

JumpStart era
JumpStart Games acquired Neopets from Viacom in March 2014. Server migration began in September. JumpStart-owned Neopets was immediately characterized by glitches and site lag. On 6 March 2015, much of the Neopets Team remaining from Viacom were laid off. Then-CEO of JumpStart David Lord assured the community that there were no plans to shut down Neopets and instead, resources were allocated to develop new content and address improve lag and site stability with plans to expand to other platforms including mobile and Facebook. The Neopets team started developing in-universe plots again in 2017 for the first time since the JumpStart acquisition. On 3 July 2017, Chinese company NetDragon acquired JumpStart Games. With the support for Adobe Flash ending in 2020, the Neopets Team announced in 2019 that it planned to transition Flash elements of the site to HTML5 by the end of 2020. The team prioritized popular features and some parts of the site are not functional. The Neopets Team also started working on developing a mobile-friendly version of the site as well as a mobile app.

During the weekend of 27–28 June 2015, the site's chat filters stopped working. The site's forums were flooded with age-inappropriate messages. In a statement on Facebook, JumpStart apologized, explaining that the issue was due to a "facility move," and that during that move, the moderation team was not able to access the Neopets community.

In 2016, Motherboard reported that the account information of an alleged 70 million of Neopets accounts had been compromised. The hack contained usernames, passwords, email addresses, birth dates, gender, and country from 2012 (prior to JumpStart's acquisition), but did not contain credit card information or physical addresses. Neopets responded by posting about the leak on their official Facebook page and sent emails out to all affected players telling them to change their passwords.

Metaverse
On September 22, 2021, the Neopets Metaverse Collection NFT was revealed in collaboration with JumpStart, Cherrypicks, and Moonvault. Users could purchase NMC tokens on the Neopets Metaverse Collection website  from November 12, 2021 ― November 15, 2021 that could then be exchanged for a randomly generated Neopet NFT on the Solana blockchain from November 15, 2021 - November 18, 2021. 4,233 NMC tokens were sold for a total of 8,708 SOLs which resulted in 4225 pieces minted for the genesis collection. Shortly after the project was announced a unique visual glitch (certain attributes were layered and colored incorrectly) revealed that at least one of images used for promotion on the Neopets Metaverse Collection website was generated using the Dress to Impress fan site, the Neopets Metaverse team replaced the image in question shortly after it was noticed and haven't responded to allegations they used Dress to Impress to generate the entire NFT collection. The Neopets Metaverse project has received a significant amount of criticism from within the Neopets community, citing general concerns about NFTs, as well as details specific to the Neopets Metaverse.

On July 20, 2022, Neopets confirmed that it had suffered a data breach the day prior. The data breach exposed Neopets' entire database schema, including usernames, emails and passwords of its 69 million users. Neopets responded by forcing a password reset for all users on August 1, 2022, causing some players to be locked out as they no longer had access to the e-mail addresses linked to their accounts. On August 29, 2022 Neopets sent an e-mail to users detailing the results of their subsequent investigation, noting that the following information for past and present users was compromised: name, email address, username, date of birth, gender, IP address, Neopets PIN, hashed password, as well as data about a player’s pet, game play, and other information provided to Neopets. They also stated that non-hashed, but inactive, passwords for players that played prior to 2015 were accessed and potentially downloaded between January 3-February 5, 2021, or July 16-19, 2022.

Reception
Described as an online cross of Pokémon and Tamagotchi, Neopets has received both praise and criticism. It has been praised for having educational content. Children can learn HTML to edit their own pages. They can also learn how to handle money by participating in the economy. Reviews from About.com and MMO Hut considered the multitude of possible activities a positive aspect. Most of the users are female, higher than in other massively multiplayer online games (MMOGs) but equivalent to social-networking-driven communities. Lucy Bradshaw, a vice president of Electronic Arts, attributes the popularity among girls to the openness of the site and said, "Games that have a tendency to satisfy on more than one dimension have a tendency to have a broader appeal and attract girls".

Luck & chance games draw criticism from parents as they introduce children to gambling. In Australia, a cross-promotion with McDonald's led to controversy with Neopets''' luck/chance games in October 2004. Australian tabloid television show Today Tonight featured a nine-year-old boy who claimed the site requires one to gamble in order to earn enough Neopoints to feed one's Neopet or else it would be sent to the pound. While gambling is not required, nor are pets sent to the pound if unfed, the website includes games of chance based on real games such as blackjack and lottery scratchcards. After this incident, Neopets prohibited users under the age of 13 from playing Neopets's casino-style games.

Rise in popularity and decline
In the 2000s, Neopets was consistently noted as one of the "stickiest" sites for children's entertainment. Stickiness is a measure of the average amount of time spent on a website. A press release from Neopets in 2001 stated that Neopets.com led in site "stickiness" in May and June, with the average user spending 117 minutes a week. Neopets also led in the average number of hours spent per user per month in December 2003 with an average of 4 hours and 47 minutes. A 2004 article stated that Nielsen//NetRatings reported that people were spending around three hours a month on Neopets, more than any other site in its Nielsen category. By May 2005, a Neopets-affiliated video game producer cited about 35 million unique users, 11 million unique IP addresses per month, and 4 billion web page views per month. This producer also described 20% of the users as 18 or older, with the median of the remaining 80% at about 14. Neopets was consistently ranked among the top ten "stickiest" sites by both Nielsen//NetRatings and comScore Media Metrix in 2005 and 2006. According to Nielsen//NetRatings, in 2007, Neopets lost about 15% of its audience over the previous year. In February 2008, comScore ranked it as the stickiest kids entertainment site with the average user spending 2 hours and 45 minutes per month.

In January 2017, Neopets then-JumpStart CEO David Lord estimated 100,000 active daily users. In January 2020, Neopets only logged 3.4 million views per month, a significant decline from its peak. In June 2020, JumpStart CEO Jim Czulewicz estimated Neopets had 100,000 daily active users and 1.5 million monthly active players.

Immersive advertising

Immersive advertising is a trademarked term for the way Neopets displayed advertisements to generate profit after Doug Dohring bought the site. Unlike pop-up and banner ads, immersive ads integrate advertisements into the site's content in interactive forms, including games and items. Players could earn Neopoints from them by playing advergames and taking part in online marketing surveys. Prior to the arrival of the NC Mall, it contributed to 60% of the revenue from the site with paying Fortune 1000 companies including Disney, General Mills, and McDonald's.

It was a contentious issue with the site with regard to the ethics of marketing to children. It drew criticism from parents, psychologists, and consumer advocates who argued that children may not know that they are being advertised to, as it blurred the line between site content and advertisement. Children under eight had difficulty recognizing ads and half a million of the 25 million users were under the age of eight in 2005. Dohring responded to such criticism stating that of the 40 percent of users twelve and younger, very few were seven or eight years old and that preschoolers were not their target audience.

Others criticised the functionality of the site. Susan Linn, another psychologist and author of Consuming Kids: The Hostile Takeover of Childhood considered the purpose of this site was to keep children in front of advertisements. Kalle Lasn, editor-in-chief and co-founder of Adbusters magazine, said the site encouraged kids to spend hours in front of a screen and recruited them to consumerism. Neopets executives stated that paid content comprised less than 1% of the site's total content. Children were not required to play or use sponsor games and items, and all ads were marked as such.

Merchandise
The popularity of Neopets spawned real-world merchandise including clothing, jewelry, stickers, books, cereals, video games and more, sold at mainstream outlets and online retailers. The most common items were plushies (stuffed animals). Each piece of merchandise has a code which can be redeemed at the site for an in-game reward. Neopets, Inc. had always planned to "bring the online and offline worlds together in ways that have never been done before". An investment banker at Allen & Company in New York said that Neopets was the only online media he had seen "that might have the ability to capture market share in the offline world".

Neopets, Inc. signed various licensing deals with companies such as Viacom Consumer Products, Thinkway Toys, and Jakks Pacific over the years. Wizards of the Coast released the Neopets Trading Card Game in September 2003, which was promoted in three of General Mills "Big G" cereals and ten Simon Property Group malls. It received two different nominations for "Toy of the Year" as well as other recognitions. Neopets: The Official Magazine was a bi-monthly magazine released the same month but it was replaced in 2008 by Beckett Plushie Pals, which featured Neopets news as well as other companies' products such as Webkinz.

In 2005, Neopets expanded to film and video game deals. The first movie was to be written by Rob Lieber and produced by Dylan Sellers and John A. Davis for Warner Bros., but the project has since been cancelled with no other projects announced. Two video games were released by Sony Computer Entertainment, Neopets: The Darkest Faerie for the PlayStation 2 in 2005 and Neopets: Petpet Adventures: The Wand of Wishing for the PlayStation Portable in 2006. 2006 also saw the release of Neopets mobile, which allowed users to visit the new land of Lutari Island, but it was discontinued on 30 June 2009, leaving the island completely inaccessible. In 2007, MumboJumbo developed a match-3 game Neopets: Codestone Quest. Neopets wouldn't attempt another mobile game until 2015, when they released a match-3 game called Ghoul Catchers for Android and iOS. However, they still released other games during those years, including Treasure Keepers for Facebook and Puzzle Adventure for Nintendo DS, Wii, and PC. In early 2019, Jumpstart announced that they were making a full mobile-friendly Neopets app, and it was scheduled to launch late in the summer of 2019.

On 10 February 2020, Blue Ant Media's Beach House Pictures announced that a Neopets'' animated television series is in development and was set to air in 2021, though there have been no recent updates. Neopets plans to expand to the Nintendo Switch.

See also
Club Penguin
JumpStart
MMORPG
Moshi Monsters
Digital pet
Petpet Park
Webkinz

References

External links

1990s toys
1999 establishments in the United Kingdom
1999 video games
Active massively multiplayer online games
Fictional mammals
Former Viacom subsidiaries
Internet properties established in 1999
Massively multiplayer online role-playing games
 
Pet websites
Video games developed in the United Kingdom
Virtual economies